The women's 100 metre freestyle was a swimming event held as part of the swimming at the 1936 Summer Olympics programme. It was the sixth appearance of the event, which was established in 1912. The competition was held from Saturday to Monday, 8 to 10 August 1936.

Thirty-three swimmers from 14 nations competed.

Records
These were the standing world and Olympic records (in minutes) prior to the 1936 Summer Olympics.

Rie Mastenbroek set a new Olympic record in the first heat with 1 minute 06.4 seconds and equaled her time in the first semi-final. In the final she lowered the Olympic record to 1 minute 05.9 seconds.

Results

Heats

Saturday 8 August 1936: The fastest three in each heat and the fastest fourth-placed from across the heats advanced to the semi-finals.

Heat 1

Heat 2

Heat 3

Heat 4

Heat 5

Semifinals

Sunday 9 August 1936: The fastest three in each semi-final and the fastest fourth-placed from across the heats advanced to the final.

Semifinal 1

Semifinal 2

Final

Monday 10 August 1936:

References

External links
Olympic Report
 

Swimming at the 1936 Summer Olympics
1936 in women's swimming
SWim